Noëlle Boisson (born 1 December 1944) is a French film editor. She was Academy Award-nominated in 1989 for The Bear, and she has won the César Award for Best Editing in 1991 for Cyrano de Bergerac, and Two Brothers in 2005.  She is a frequent collaborator with Jean-Jacques Annaud and Jean-Paul Rappeneau.

Selected filmography (as editor)
 The Bear (1988)
 Cyrano de Bergerac (1990)
 The Lover (1992)
 The Horseman on the Roof (1995)
 Seven Years in Tibet (1997)
 Two Brothers (2004)

References

External links
 Video interview (in French)

1944 births
French film editors
Living people
French women film editors